"Canter" is a song by Scottish singer-songwriter and acoustic guitarist Gerry Cinnamon. It was released as a single on 22 June 2019 by Little Runaway Records as the lead single from his second studio album The Bonny.

Background
In an interview with Radio X, Cinnamon said, "It's an upbeat tune. It's just one of those tunes I try and drop some knowledge bombs. When I was a wee guy I was always trying to look for a bit of Gold in a song, for a bit of advice, so I think it's me just talking to myself. I wrote this a couple of weeks before the Barras [Glasgow Barrowlands], and it's just one of them that's demanded [at gigs]. Same thing happened with Belter." He also confirmed that the word 'canter' is Scots for 'easy peasy'.

Charts

Certifications

Release history

References

2019 songs
2019 singles
Gerry Cinnamon songs